The Smashing Pumpkins are an American alternative rock band formed in 1988. The band has recorded many songs since their formation, with frontman Billy Corgan being the principle songwriter for most of their songs. The Smashing Pumpkins have also gone through many line-up changes, with Corgan being the most consistent member of the group. Below is a list of songs they have recorded as a band.

List

Notes

References

Smashing Pumpkins, The